Maxwell is an unincorporated community in Center Township, Hancock County, Indiana.

History
Maxwell was laid out and platted in 1881, and was named for a man who worked on building the railroad to the town. The Maxwell post office was established in 1882.

Geography

Education
Greenfield-Central Community School Corporation operates area schools, including Maxwell Intermediate School. The local high school is Greenfield-Central High School.

References

Unincorporated communities in Hancock County, Indiana
Unincorporated communities in Indiana